The City Forex Stadium is an international cricket stadium in Guangzhou, Guangdong, China. It is used mostly for cricket and also for Australian football, rugby tens, rugby union and touch rugby. GZ United are the tenants of the stadium.

Stadium is located in the Guangdong University of Technology in the Higher Education Mega Centre and encompassing an area of 6355 m2, with seating for 12,000 spectators. The stadium hosted the first international-level cricket ever played in China.

It has been granted by the International Cricket Council to host One Day International and Twenty20 cricket matches. It was established in 2010. It hosted the cricket matches played in the 2010 Asian Games,  both men's and women's. It also hosted the 2012 Women's Asia Cup Cricket tournament.

Work on the stadium started in May 2008. However, even until August 2009, the ground was little more than a flattened patch of mud. The ground now has a full-time Bangladeshi curator Jasimuddin, who had previously managed the Kinrara Oval in Malaysia.

The ground was designed by Chinese architects with materials sourced from Guangdong Province, the wicket square using clay from Shaanxi Province in central China, the certified seed turf being imported by the Chinese Cricket Association from the United States.

References

Sports venues in Guangzhou
Cricket grounds in China
Buildings and structures in Guangzhou
Venues of the 2010 Asian Games